Betws Ifan (antiquarian forms include Bettws Evan and Bettws Ieuvan) is a small village located in Ceredigion, Wales.

Surrounding villages include Beulah, Brongest, Glynarthen and Aberporth. Betws Ifan is only a few miles away from Cardigan town and Newcastle Emlyn town. The village is built around the village hall,  located in the heart of the village. The village also includes a bakery.

External links
GENUKI(tm) page
1910 Kelly's Directory entry
www.geograph.co.uk : photos of Betws Ifan and surrounding area

Villages in Ceredigion